The 1901 Nobel Peace Prize was the first peace prize resulting from Alfred Nobel's will to recognize in the preceding year those who "have done the most or the best work for fraternity between nations, for the abolition or reduction of standing armies and for the holding and promotion of peace congresses." It was equally divided between the Swiss humanitarian Henri Dunant (1828–1910) "for his humanitarian efforts to help wounded soldiers and create international understanding" and the French pacifist Frédéric Passy (1822–1912) "for his lifelong work for international peace conferences, diplomacy and arbitration." It was the first of the many times the Nobel Peace Prize has been shared between two or more individuals.

Laureates

Jean-Henri Dunant

Witnessing the aftermath of the 1859 Battle of Solferino in Northern Italy, whereupon he saw thousands of Italian, French and Austrian soldiers killing and maiming each other, Henri Dunant, a Swiss businessman, took the initiative of establishing a neutral aid organization to help the sick and wounded on the battlefield. The result was the establishment of the International Committee of the Red Cross in 1863 with the assistance of jurist Gustave Moynier, army general Henri Dufour, and doctors Théodore Maunoir and Louis Appia – all would become the founding fathers of the Red Cross Committee – and the adoption of the Geneva Convention in the following year. It laid down the realization of Dunant's idea for an independent organization to care and rescue for wounded soldiers. Dunant write a book recording his experinces, Un Souvenir de Solferino ("A Memory of Solferino", 1862), which he uses as a reminder for his humanitarian advocacy and inspiration for his cause.

Frédéric Passy

As a prominent economist and politician, Frédéric Passy was involved in many pacifist causes. He founded the first French Peace Society, which held a congress in Paris during the 1878 World Exhibition and also was one of the founding fathers of the Inter-Parliamentary Union, an organization for cooperation between the elected representatives of different countries. As an independent leftist republic in the French Chamber of Deputies, he opposed France's colonial policy since it went against the principles of free trade and maintained that free trade between independent nations promoted peace. Passy continued to campaigning for peace despite his advanced age. Despite his economic works gaining little traction, his efforts in the peace movement resulted in him being recognized as the "dean of European peace activists".

Deliberations

Nominations
Henri Dunant was nominated with 20 separate nominations from politicians, academics and heads of peace societies. Frédéric Passy, on the other hand, earned 42, making it the highest number of nominations for the year. In total, the newly formed Norwegian Nobel Committee received 137 nominations for 29 individuals and 6 organizations including Charles Albert Gobat and Élie Ducommun (both awarded in 1902), William Randal Cremer (awarded in 1903), Nicholas II of Russia, Herbert Spencer, Gustave Moynier, Leo Tolstoy, Fredrik Bajer (awarded in 1908), Friedrich Martens, The Institute of International Law (awarded in 1904) and Inter-Parliamentary Union. The Austrian author Bertha von Suttner (awarded in 1905) and American politician Belva Ann Lockwood were the first two women nominated for the peace prize.

Norwegian Nobel Committee
The following members of the Norwegian Nobel Committee appointed by the Storting were responsible for the selection of the 1901 Nobel laureate in accordance with the will of Alfred Nobel:

Notes

References

External links

1901
Henry Dunant